"Wild Women Do" is a song by American singer-songwriter Natalie Cole. The song was written by Greg Prestopino, Sam Lorber, and Matthew Wilder for the 1990 romantic comedy film Pretty Woman and was included on the film's soundtrack as the opening track. The song's lyrics describes an independent woman who lives a wild life and contains influences from pop, rock, R&B, and soul music. In 1990, the song was also included on certain re-issues of Cole's 1989 album Good to Be Back.

Produced by André Fischer, "Wild Women Do" was released in 1990 as the second single from the Pretty Woman soundtrack. It became Cole's penultimate top-40 hit in the United States, peaking at number 38 on the Billboard Hot 100 chart. Worldwide, the single charted in several countries, peaking within the top 40 in Australia, Ireland, and New Zealand and the top 20 in the United Kingdom as well as on the Canadian Dance and Adult Contemporary charts.

Composition
"Wild Women Do" contains elements of pop, rock, R&B, and soul music. The track's lyrics describe a strong-willed, independent woman who is not afraid to take risks and lives a life of freedom, which describes Julia Roberts' character Vivian in Pretty Woman. Natalie Cole's vocal performance on the song has been described as "soulful yet aggressive".

Chart performance
On February 24, 1990, "Wild Women Do" made its first appearance on the US Billboard Hot 100 chart at number 84. Seven weeks later, the song rose to its peak of number 34, becoming Cole's penultimate top-40 hit in the United States and her final solo top-40 single. It stayed on the Hot 100 for 10 weeks in total. A remix of the song appeared on the Billboard Dance Club Songs chart, peaking at number eight to become Cole's third top-10 song on the listing. In Canada, the track appeared on the RPM Dance and Adult Contemporary charts, peaking at numbers 19 and 24, respectively.

Outside North America, "Wild Women Do" charted in several English-speaking countries. It first appeared on the UK Singles Chart in April 1990, debuting at number 58 and climbing to number 16, its peak, two weeks later. It gave Cole her seventh top-40 hit in the United Kingdom and spent seven weeks in the top 100. In Ireland, the song first charted within the Irish Singles Chart top 30 in May 1990 and peaked at number 29. With its British sales alone, the single peaked at number 42 on the Eurochart Hot 100. On July 29, 1990, "Wild Women Do" debuted at number 42 on New Zealand's RIANZ Singles Chart and rose to number 35 two weeks later, while in Australia, the song debuted at its peak of number 23 in September 1990 and spent three weeks within the ARIA Singles Chart top 50.

Track listings

US 12-inch single
A1. "Wild Women Do" (Get Wild wit Me remix) – 4:04
A2. "Wild Women Do" (Power mix—with rap) – 4:18
A3. "Wild Women Do" (Power mix—no rap) – 4:36
A4. "Wild Women Do" (single version) – 4:06
B1. "Wild Women Do" (Get Wild wit Me club remix) – 7:11
B2. "Wild Women Do" (Get Wild wit Me dub remix) – 6:56
B3. "Wild Women Do" (Underground Wacko mix) – 6:45

US cassette single
 "Wild Women Do"
 "Wild Women Do" (Get Wild wit Me mix)

UK 7-inch and cassette single
 "Wild Women Do" (Power mix with rap) – 4:18
 "Wild Women Do" (US single version) – 4:06

UK 12-inch single
A1. "Wild Women Do" (Power mix with rap—extended version) – 5:55
B1. "Wild Women Do" (Get Wild wit Me dub mix) – 6:56
B2. "Wild Women Do" (US single version) – 4:06

UK CD single
 "Wild Women Do" (Power mix with rap) – 4:18
 "Wild Women Do" (US single mix) – 4:06
 "Wild Women Do" (Get Wild wit Me mix) – 4:04
 "Wild Women Do" (Underground Wacko mix) – 6:45

Australian 7-inch and cassette single
 "Wild Women Do" (single version) – 4:06
 "Wild Women Do" (Get Wild wit Me) – 4:04

Personnel
Personnel are lifted from the Pretty Woman: Original Motion Picture Soundtrack liner notes.
 Greg Prestopino – writing
 Sam Lorber – writing
 Matthew Wilder – writing
 André Fischer – production
 Humberto Gatica – mixing

Charts

References

1990 singles
1990 songs
EMI Records singles
Natalie Cole songs
Songs with feminist themes
Songs written by Matthew Wilder
Songs written by Sam Lorber
Songs written for films